The Avenging Quartet (霸海紅英) is a 1993 Hong Kong martial arts action crime film directed by Stanley Siu Wing, starring Cynthia Khan and Moon Lee.

Plot
A man flees China with a painting that contains a list of Japanese officials from World War II. His girlfriend (Cynthia Khan) follows him. The Japanese send a woman (Yukari Oshima) to Hong Kong to retrieve the painting, where she is joined by a friend (Michiko Nishiwaki) and they both team up to find him.

Cast
Cynthia Khan as Chin (as Yeung Lai Ching)
Moon Lee as Feng (as Lee Choi Fung)
Chin Kar-lok as Paul (as Chin Ka Lok)
Waise Lee as Chi Hsiong (as Lee Chi Hung)
Yukari Ôshima as Oshima (as Yukari Tsumura)
Michiko Nishiwaki as Sen (as Nishiwaki Michiko)
James Ha as Sen's Partner
Mark King as Assassin
Leung Sam as Uncle Ben
Hung San-Nam (as Hung Sun Lam)
Yee Tin Hung
Lui Tat
Chim Bing Hei (as Jim Bin Hay)

References

External links 

1993 films
Hong Kong martial arts films
1990s Hong Kong films